Vindemialis was Bishop of Orange from 527 to 549.

He attended, and probably hosted, the famous second Council of Orange on July 3, 529, that was chaired by Saint Caesarius of Arles.

Notes and references

Bishops of Orange
6th-century deaths
People from Orange, Vaucluse